County of Bentheim is a district (Landkreis) in Lower Saxony, Germany. It is bounded by (from the west and clockwise) the Dutch provinces of Overijssel and Drenthe, the district of Emsland, and the districts of  Steinfurt and Borken in North Rhine-Westphalia.

History 

The District has roughly the same territory as the County of Bentheim, a state of the Holy Roman Empire that was dissolved in 1803.

Geography 

The district's north-western region named  (low county) protrudes into Dutch territory, and borders it to the north, west and south. The Vechte River (Dutch Vecht) traverses the district from south to north and flows into the Netherlands.

Coat of arms 
The arms are identical to the arms of the historic County of Bentheim. The origin of these arms is unknown.

Towns and municipalities

References

External links

Official website 

Districts of Lower Saxony